This is a list of seasons played by women's football club Zvezda 2005 Perm, in Russian and European football, from its foundation to the latest completed season.

Summary

References

Zvezda 2005 Perm
Zvezda 2005 Perm